Sri Vetrimalai Murugan Temple is a Hindu temple located in Port Blair, which is the capital of the Andaman and Nicobar Islands, India. This temple, dedicated to the Hindu deity Murugan, is an important Hindu pilgrimage site for the islands. It is a center of festivities during important Hindu festivals through the year.

See also 
 Murugan
 Port Blair

References

External Links 

Hindu temples in Andaman and Nicobar Islands
Port Blair
Kartikeya temples
20th-century Hindu temples